Giedrė Lukšaitė-Mrázková (born 1944) is a Lithuanian–Czech harpsichordist and organist.

Lukšaitė was born to the family of educator  and cultural historian Meilė Lukšienė in Kaunas, Lithuania. She studied organ and piano at the Musical Academy in Vilnius, and at the P. I. Tchaikovsky State Conservatory in Moscow. She completed study at the Musical College of Academy of Performing Arts in Prague in 1974. Her professor was organist Jiří Rheinberger. After that she studied harpsichord with Zuzana Růžičková.

As professor of the Faculty of Music of the Academy of Performing Arts in Prague, she has collaborated with Jaroslav Tůma, Gabriela Demeterová, and with many orchestras (the Dresden Philharmonic, the Lithuanian Chamber Orchestra etc.). She was a member of chamber orchestra Ars Rediviva (led by Music Director Milan Munclinger).

References

1944 births
Living people
Czech harpsichordists
Czech classical organists
Lithuanian classical musicians
Moscow Conservatory alumni
Academy of Performing Arts in Prague alumni
Women organists
Lithuanian organists
20th-century Lithuanian musicians
20th-century organists
20th-century women musicians
21st-century organists
21st-century women musicians
20th-century classical musicians
21st-century classical musicians